Rayṭa bint al-Saffāḥ was an Abbasid princess, daughter of first Abbasid caliph al-Saffah, niece of second Abbasid caliph al-Mansur and the first wife of third Abbasid caliph al-Mahdi.

Biography
Rayta was the daughter of al-Saffah from his famous wife Umm Salama, who belonged to Makhzum clan of the Quraysh. Her father was the first Abbasid caliph, ruling from 750 to 754. 

Rayta had an older maternal half-brother, Sa'id ibn Maslama, from her mother's first marriage to the Umayyad prince Maslama ibn Hisham. Sa'id was the grandson of the Umayyad caliph Hisham. Sa'id became an oral transmitter of historical tradition in the early Abbasid period.

Rayta was very young, when her father died. Al-Saffah's brother, al-Mansur, took on the responsibility of establishing the Abbasid caliphate by holding on to power for nearly twenty-two years, from Dhu al-Hijjah 136 AH until Dhu al-Hijjah 158 AH (754–775 CE).

In 761, the Abbasid caliph al-Mahdi married Rayta as his first wife after his return from Khurasan. She gave birth to two sons, Ubaydallah and Ali.

Rayta remained the most influential wife of al-Mahdi until his marriage to al-Khayzuran bint Atta, an Arab woman of Yemenite origin born in the Hejaz. Al-Khayzuran convinced al-Mahdi to free and marry her, depriving Rayta of her privileges: she also convinced him to deprive his son by Rayta from the position of heir to the throne, and instead name her sons as heirs, despite the fact that the custom at that time did not allow for the sons of a slave to be named heirs. From that point on, she was the caliph's most influential wife.

Family
Rayta was related to the Abbasid dynasty, the ruling house of the Caliphate both maternally and paternally. She was contemporary to several Abbasid caliphs, Abbasid princes and Princesses.

References

Sources
 
 
 Sanders, P. (1990). The Meadows of Gold: The Abbasids by MAS‘UDI. Translated and edited by Lunde Paul and Stone Caroline, Kegan Paul International, London and New York, 1989 ISBN 0 7103 0246 0. Middle East Studies Association Bulletin, 24(1), 50–51. doi:10.1017/S0026318400022549
 
 

8th-century births
8th-century deaths
8th-century women from the Abbasid Caliphate
Daughters of Abbasid caliphs
Wives of Abbasid caliphs
8th-century people from the Abbasid Caliphate
Arab princesses
8th-century Arabs